Wemen is a locality in Victoria, Australia, located approximately  from Mildura, Victoria.

Wemen Post Office opened on 24 November 1924 and closed in 1974.

References

Towns in Victoria (Australia)
Rural City of Swan Hill